Yenikənd is a village in the Zangilan District of Azerbaijan.

References

Populated places in Zangilan District